The Regional Chair of Ottawa-Carleton was the head of the regional council that controlled the Regional Municipality of Ottawa-Carleton from its formation in 1968 to its elimination in 2001.

Originally the Regional Chair was selected by other members of regional council who were themselves posted to the council from the region's individual municipalities. From 1991 the position of regional chair was an elected position and as of 1994 regional councillors were elected. This position disappeared in 2001 when the Region and its municipalities were amalgamated into the city of Ottawa. The final Regional Chair was Bob Chiarelli who was subsequently elected Mayor of the amalgamated city.

List of Regional Chairs 
Denis Coolican 1968–1978
Andrew S. Haydon 1978–1991
Peter D. Clark 1991–1997
Bob Chiarelli 1997–2000

Further reading
 

Municipal government of Ottawa